was a Japanese spree killer and novelist.

Biography
Nagayama was born in Abashiri, Hokkaido and grew up with divorced parents. He moved to Tokyo in 1965 and, while working in Tokyo's Shibuya district, witnessed the Zama and Shibuya shootings.

Nagayama killed four people with a handgun between October11 and November5, 1968. He robbed the last two victims of 16,420yen. He was arrested on April7, 1969. When he was arrested, he was 19years old and was regarded as a minor under Japanese law at the time.

The Tokyo District Court sentenced him to death in 1979, though this was overturned by the Tokyo High Court, which imposed a sentence of life imprisonment in 1981. The Supreme Court of Japan reversed the high court's decision in 1983. This ruling is today considered the landmark decision for the application of the death penalty in Japan. The high court on remand subsequently sentenced him to death in 1987, a decision which the Supreme Court upheld in 1990.

In prison, Nagayama wrote many novels and became a public figure. In 1983, he was awarded a prize for the novel . The Japanese writing community was uneasy with his success, given his status as a convicted killer. He was rejected by the Japan Writers' Association but did receive recognition in Saarland, Germany in 1996.

On August1, 1997, he was executed at the Tokyo Detention Center at the age of 48 by decision of Justice Minister Isao Matsuura, just 34days after the arrest of Seito Sakakibara, the 14-year-old perpetrator of the Kobe child murders. He made no final statement. A foundation to save poor people was established by his will.

Victims
Masanori Nakamura (中村 公紀, Nakamura Masanori)
Tomejirō Katsumi (勝見 留次郎, Katsumi Tomejirō)
Tetsuhiko Saitō (斎藤 哲彦, Saitō Tetsuhiko)
Masaaki Itō (伊藤 正明, Itō Masaaki)

Works

See also
 A.K.A. Serial Killer, a documentary film on Nagayama
 Live Today, Die Tomorrow!, a drama film on Nagayama
 List of executions in Japan

References

External links
In Secrecy, Japan Hangs a Best-Selling Author, a Killer of 4 New York Times, August 7, 1997
10 years after hanging, killer still offers lessons to be learned The Japan Times, August 1, 2007
 Norio Nagayama
A.K.A Serial Killer, accessed July 17, 2017.

1949 births
1997 deaths
20th-century Japanese novelists
People from Hokkaido
People executed by Japan by hanging
20th-century executions by Japan
Executed Japanese people
Japanese people convicted of murder
People convicted of murder by Japan
Executed spree killers
1968 murders in Japan